Mario Campos López (born 15 May 1943) is a Mexican chess International Master (IM, 1975), two-times Mexican Chess Championship winner (1973, 1974).

Chess player career 
From the begin of 1970s to the begin 1980s, Mario Campos López was one of Mexico's leading chess players. He twice won the Mexican Chess Championship: 1973 and 1974. In 1969 in Quito and Guayaquil Mario Campos López participated in FIDE World Chess Championship Central American Zonal tournament and shared 4th-5th place. In 1975 in Santo Domingo he participated in FIDE World Chess Championship Caribbean-Central American Zonal tournament and shared 3rd-4th place.

Mario Campos López played for Mexico in the Chess Olympiad:
 In 1972, at first board in the 20th Chess Olympiad in Skopje (+7, =6, -2),
 In 1974, at first board in the 21st Chess Olympiad in Nice (+4, =8, -4),
 In 1978, at second board in the 23rd Chess Olympiad in Buenos Aires (+4, =5, -4),
 In 1980, at second board in the 24th Chess Olympiad in La Valletta (+0, =4, -4),
 In 1982, at fourth board in the 25th Chess Olympiad in Lucerne (+2, =1, -4).

References

External links

1943 births
Living people
Chess International Masters
Mexican chess players
Chess Olympiad competitors